Tanda Thermal Power Station is located in Ambedkar Nagar district in the Indian state of Uttar Pradesh. The power plant is one of the coal based power plants of NTPC. The coal for the power plant is sourced from North Karnpura Coal Fields. Source of water for the power plant is from Tanda Pump Canal on Saryu River.

In the year 2000, Uttar Pradesh State Electricity Board (U.P.S.E.B.) transferred Tanda Thermal Power Plant to NTPC Limited against payment overdue. After acquisition of this plant, because of the better maintenance by NTPC Limited, this power plant has crossed its Plant Load Factor (P.L.F.) to more than 100%.

Installed capacity
Stage-I and present installed capacity are listed below:

For Stage-II, NTPC Limited has installed two new units of 660 MWs each.

Stage-I  : 4x110 MWs = 440 MWs 

Stage-II : 660 MW + 660MW = 1320 MW

Total Power Generation : 1760 MWs

References

 NTPC Tanda

Coal-fired power stations in Uttar Pradesh
Ambedkar Nagar district
Year of establishment missing